Li Xian (born 19 October 1991) is a Chinese actor. His role as Guo Deyou in Tientsin Mystic earned him a nomination at The Actors of China Award for Best Web Drama Actor, and popularity award from Netease Awards In 2019, his role as Han Shangyan on Go Go Squid! earned him a nomination at Huading Awards for Best Newcomer, and a nomination at The Actors of China Award for Best actor (Emerald Category). He won Tencent Video All Star Awards for Quality Actor of the Year;, and popularity awards at Weibo Weibo TV Awards; iQIYI All-Star Carnival, GQ Men of the Year, Esquire's Man At His Best Awards, Film and TV Role Model Annual Ranking, and Best Choice of Multi-Screen Communication for Influential Actor. He listed as The Beijing News's Entertainment Person of the Year, as well as a spot in Forbes China 30 Under 30.

Awards and nominations

Other accolades

State honors

Listicles

Notes

References

Lists of awards received by Chinese actor